The Goseong Fire of 2019 was a fire in Goseong County, South Korea on April 4–6, 2019 that spread to the cities of Sokcho, Inje, Donghae and Gangneung okgye-myeon leading to two deaths, over 30 injuries and the evacuation of over 4,000 residents. The cause of the fire is still under investigation, but is believed to be started by an extra high-voltage wire owned by Korea Electric Power Corporation that fell due to high winds which led to an electric arc. The fire damaged over 200 homes and over 2,000 buildings causing estimated damages of 5.2 billion South Korean won ($4.6 million). More than 13,000 firefighters were mobilized from other parts of the country to fight the fire. 
The Captain of the South Korea national football team, Heung-Min Son donated £100,000 to victims of the fire

See also
 2019 Amazon rainforest wildfires

References

2019 wildfires
2019 in South Korea
April 2019 events in South Korea
Building and structure fires in South Korea